The following is a list of vascular plants, bryophytes and lichens which were regarded as rare species by the authors of British Plant Communities, together with the communities in which they occur.

Vascular plants

 Man orchid (Aceras anthropophorum) CG2, CG3, CG5
 Baneberry (Actaea spicata) W9
 Bristle bent (Agrostis curtisii) H2, H3, H4, H5, H6
 Ground-pine (Ajuga chamaepitys) CG2, OV15
 The lady's-mantle Alchemilla filicaulis ssp. filicaulis CG10
 The lady's-mantle Alchemilla acutiloba MG3
 The lady's-mantle Alchemilla glomerulans MG3
 The lady's-mantle Alchemilla monticola  MG3
 The lady's-mantle Alchemilla subcrenata  MG3
 The lady's-mantle Alchemilla wichurae  MG3, CG10
 Babington's leek (Allium ampeloprasum var. babingtonii) OV6
 Chives (Allium schoenoprasum) H6,  H7, MC5
 Three-cornered garlic (Allium triquetrum) OV24
 Bog-rosemary (Andromeda polifolia) M2
 Annual vernal-grass (Anthoxanthum aristatum) OV1
 Loose silky-bent (Apera spica-venti) OV5
 Bristol rock-cress (Arabis stricta) CG1
 Field wormwood (Artemisia campestris) CG7
 Goldilocks aster (Aster linosyris) CG1
 Purple milk-vetch (Astragalus danicus)  H7, CG2, CG3, CG4, CG5, CG7, SD11, SD12, MC10,  MC5
 Wild cabbage (Brassica oleracea) OV41, MC4, MC5
 Lesser quaking-grass (Briza minor) OV1, OV2, OV6
 Lesser hairy brome (Bromus benekenii) W9
 Great pignut (Bunium bulbocastanum) CG2
 Small hare's-ear (Bupleurum baldense) CG1
 European box (Buxus sempervirens) W13
 Narrow small-reed (Calamagrostis stricta) S1
 Narrow-leaved bittercress (Cardamine impatiens) W8
 Fibrous tussock-sedge (Carex appropinquata) W3
 Hair sedge (Carex capillaris) CG10
 String sedge (Carex chordorrhiza) M4
 Lesser tussock-sedge (Carex diandra) W3
 Elongated sedge (Carex elongata) W2
 Rare spring-sedge (Carex ericetorum) CG2, CG5, CG7
 Dwarf sedge (Carex humilis) CG1, CG2, CG3
 Tall bog-sedge (Carex magellanica) M2
 Soft-leaved sedge (Carex montana) H4, CG2, CG10
 Rock sedge (Carex rupestris) CG10
 Common centaury (Centaurium erythraea var. capitatum) MC5
 Dwarf mouse-ear (Cerastium pumilum) CG1, CG2
 Tuberous thistle (Cirsium tuberosum) MG5, CG2
 Coralroot orchid (Corallorrhiza trifida) W3
 Grey hair-grass (Corynephorus canescens) SD11
 Sea-kale (Crambe maritima) SD1
 Northern hawk's-beard (Crepis mollis) W9
 Mezereon (Daphne mezereum) W8
 Yellow whitlowgrass (Draba aizoides) CG1, OV41
 Hoary whitlowgrass (Draba incana) CG10
 Crested buckler-fern (Dryopteris cristata) W2
 The fern Dryopteris × uliginosa, the hybrid of crested buckler-fern and narrow buckler-fern (D. carthusiana) W2
 Dorset heath (Erica ciliaris) H3, H4
 Cornish heath (Erica vagans) H4, H5, H6,  H7
 Musk stork's-bill (Erodium moschatum) OV14
 Portland spurge (Euphorbia portlandica) H7, CG1
 The eyebright Euphrasia pseudokerneri CG2
 Wood fescue (Festuca altissima) W8
 Snake's-head fritillary (Fritillaria meleagris) MG4
 Tall ramping-fumitory (Fumaria bastardii) OV6, OV11, OV13
 Yellow star-of-Bethlehem (Gagea lutea) W9
 Wall bedstraw (Galium parisiense) CG7
 Slender bedstraw (Galium pumilum) CG2, CG5
 Limestone bedstraw (Galium sterneri) CG2, CG10
 Early gentian (Gentianella anglica) CG1, CG2
 Chiltern gentian (Gentianella germanica) CG2
 Hairy greenweed (Genista pilosa)) H2,  H7, MC5
 Bog orchid (Hammarbya paludosa) M1
 White rock-rose (Helianthemum apenninum) CG1
 Hoary rock-rose (Helianthemum canum) CG1
 The hybrid between white and hoary rock-roses Helianthemum × sulfureum CG1
 Musk orchid (Herminium monorchis) CG2, CG4, CG5
 Fringed rupturewort (Herniaria ciliolata) H7, MC5
 Lizard orchid (Himantoglossum hircinum) CG7
 Hutchinsia (Hornungia petraea)  CG7, OV39
 Spotted cat's-ear (Hypochoeris maculata) CG1, CG2, CG3
 Wild candytuft (Iberis amara) CG2
 Land quillwort (Isoetes histrix) H7
 Dwarf rush (Juncus capitatus) H6
 Somerset hair-grass (Koeleria vallesiana) CG1
 Rock sea-lavender (Limonium recurvum) MC1
 Perennial flax (Linum perenne subsp. anglicum) CG2, CG3
 Hairy bird's-foot trefoil (Lotus hispidus) MC5
 Tufted loosestrife (Lysimachia thyrsiflora) W1, W3, M4

 Bur medick (Medicago minima) CG7
 Sickle medick (Medicago falcata) CG7
 Toothed medick (Medicago polymorpha) OV14
 Sand lucerne (Medicago sativa ssp. varia) CG7
 Oysterplant (Mertensia maritima) SD3
 Early sand-grass (Mibora minima) SD19, MC5
 Fine-leaved sandwort (Minuartia hybrida) CG7
 Spring sandwort (Minuartia verna) H7, CG10, MC5
 Alpine forget-me-not (Myosotis alpestris) CG10
 Dwarf cudweed (Omalotheca supina) CG10
 Small restharrow (Ononis reclinata) MC5
 Late spider-orchid (Ophrys fuciflora) CG2
 Early spider-orchid (Ophrys sphegodes) CG2, MC4
 Monkey orchid (Orchis simia) CG2
 Burnt orchid (Orchis ustulata) CG2
 Orange bird's-foot (Ornithopus pinnatus) MC5
 Oxtongue broomrape (Orobanche picridis) CG2
 Purple oxytropis (Oxytropus halleri) MC10
 Curved hard-grass (Parapholis incurva) MC1
 Milk-parsley (Peucedanum palustre) W2
 Purple-stem cat's-tail (Phleum phleoides) CG7
 Round-headed rampion (Phyteuma tenerum) CG2, CG3, CG5
 Bulbous meadow-grass (Poa bulbosa) MC5
 Early meadow-grass (Poa infirma) MC5
 Jacob's-ladder (Polemonium caeruleum) MG2
 Four-leaved allseed (Polycarpon tetraphyllum) MC5
 Dwarf milkwort (Polygala amara) CG2
 Chalk milkwort (Polygala calcarea) CG2, CG3, CG5
 Whorled Solomon's-seal (Polygonatum verticillatum) W9
 Ray's knotgrass (Polygonum oxyspermum ssp. raii) SD2,  SD3
 Holly fern (Polystichum lonchitis) OV40
 Spring cinquefoil (Potentilla neumanniana)  CG1, CG7
 Oxlip (Primula elatior) W8
 Primula × digenea, the hybrid between oxlip and primrose (P. vulgaris) W8
 Scottish primrose (Primula scotica) H7, MC10
 Pasqueflower (Pulsatilla vulgaris) CG2, CG3, CG5
 Round-leaved wintergreen (Pyrola rotundifolia) W2, W3
 Brown beak-sedge (Rhynchospora fusca) M1
 Mountain currant (Ribes alpinum) W8
 Sand crocus (Romulea columnae) MC5
 Alpine pearlwort (Sagina saginoides) CG10
 Dwarf willow (Salix herbacea) CG10
 Dark-leaved willow (Salix myrsinifolia) W3
 Meadow clary (Salvia pratensis) CG2
 Perennial glasswort (Sarcocornia perennis) SM10
 Shepherd's-needle (Scandix pecten-veneris) OV15
 Rannoch-rush (Scheuchzeria palustris) M1
 Autumn squill (Scilla autumnalis) H7, CG1,  MC5
 Spring squill (Scilla verna) H5, H6,  H7, MC10, CG1, MC5, MC12
 Rock stonecrop (Sedum forsterianum) CG1
 Silver ragwort (Senecio cineraria) CG1
 Field fleawort (Senecio integrifolius ssp. integrifolius) CG2, CG3, MC5
 Moon carrot (Seseli libanotis) CG2
 Sibbaldia (Sibbaldia procumbens) CG10
 Sand catchfly (Silene conica) CG7
 Small-flowered catchfly (Silene gallica) OV2, OV6
 Night-flowering catchfly (Silene noctiflora) OV16
 Nottingham catchfly (Silene nutans) MG1, CG2, OV41, OV39, MC4
 Spanish catchfly (Silene otites) CG7
 London-rocket (Sisymbrium irio) OV14
 Autumn ladies'-tresses (Spiranthes spiralis) CG2, H7
 The dandelion Taraxacum fulgidum MG4
 The dandelion Taraxacum haematicum MG4
 The dandelion Taraxacum melanthoides MG4
 The dandelion Taraxacum sublaeticolor MG4
 The dandelion Taraxacum subundulatum MG4
 The dandelion Taraxacum tamesense MG4
 Cut-leaved germander (Teucrium botrys) CG2
 Marsh fern (Thelypteris palustris) W2
 Bastard toadflax (Thesium humifusum) CG2, CG3, CG5
 Breckland thyme (Thymus serpyllum) CG7
 Large thyme (Thymus pulegioides) CG2, CG3, CG5
 Large-leaved lime (Tilia platyphyllos) W8
 Scottish asphodel (Tofieldia pusilla) CG10
 Twin-headed clover (Trifolium bocconei) H6, H7
 Western clover (Trifolium occidentale) H7, MC10, MC5
 Suffocated clover (Trifolium suffocatum) MC5, OV2
 Intermediate bladderwort (Utricularia intermedia) M1
 Spiked speedwell (Veronica spicata) CG1, CG2, CG7
 Fingered speedwell (Veronica triphyllos) OV3
 Spring speedwell (Veronica verna) CG7
 Pale dog-violet (Viola lactea) H3
 Dune fescue (Vulpia membranacea) SD19
 Alpine woodsia (Woodsia alpina) OV40

Bryophytes

Mosses

 Side-fruited crisp-moss Pleurochaete squarrosa CG7
 Curving feather-moss Scorpiurium circinatum CG1
 Golden bog-moss Sphagnum pulchrum M1,  M2
 Neat crisp-moss Tortella nitida CG1

Liverworts

 Greater pawwort Barbilophozia lycopodioides U6

Lichens
 Bacidia muscorum CG7
 Buellia epigaea CG7
 Diploschistes scruposus var. bryophilus CG7
 Fulgensia fulgens CG7
 Lecidea decipiens CG7
 Squamaria lentigera CG7
 Toximia caerulea var. nigricans CG7
 Toximia lobulata CG7

British National Vegetation Classification
Lists of biota of the United Kingdom
British National Vegetation Classification, rare